Neoclinus okazakii is a species of chaenopsid blenny found in rocky reefs around Japan, in the northwestern Pacific ocean.

Etymology 
The specific name "okazakii" refers to Dr. Toshio Okazaki, who is credited with leading to the identification of Neoclinus okazakii as a distinct species.

References
 Fukao, R., 1987 (10 Dec.) Fishes of Neoclinus bryope species complex from Shirahama, Japan, with description of two new species. Japanese Journal of Ichthyology v. 34 (no. 3): 291–308.

okazakii
Fish described in 1987